Cassipourea fanshawei is a species of plant in the Rhizophoraceae family. It is endemic to Zambia.

References

fanshawei
Vulnerable plants
Endemic flora of Zambia
Taxonomy articles created by Polbot
Taxa named by António Rocha da Torre